Bayi Nanchang Women's Volleyball Team, formerly Bayi Kemen Noodle Manufacturing named from 2001 to 2015 and Bayi Shenzhen from 2015 to 2018, was a professional women's volleyball club based in Nanchang, Jiangxi and competes in the Chinese Women's Volleyball Super League. They won the championship in 2001 and 2014. The team was based in Shenzhen, and later in Nanchang.

Fan Linlin, Yang Junjing, Yuan Xinyue, and Liu Yanhan were national team players. Shen Jingsi, Sun Xiaoqing, Chen Yao, Bai Yun, and Wang Lin were former national players. The team was established in 1951. A unique feature of the team was that all of its players were members of the People's Liberation Army.

CVL results

Roster

2016-2017

Former players
  Cui Yongmei
  Wu Yongmei
  Wang Lina
  Song Nina
  Zhao Ruirui
  Suo Ma
  Li Ying
  Bai Yun
  Wang Lin
  Sun Xiaoqing
  Ye Shuting
  Liu Congcong
  Fan Linlin
  Zhu Linfen

Honors
Asian Women's Club Volleyball Championship
Second place - 2004, 2016

References

Chinese volleyball clubs
Volleyball clubs established in 1951
1951 establishments in China
Sports clubs disestablished in 2020
2020 disestablishments in China
Military sports clubs